The 2020 South Carolina Education Lottery 200 was the 15th stock car race of the 2020 NASCAR Gander RV & Outdoors Truck Series and the 7th iteration of the event, after the NASCAR Gander RV & Outdoors Truck Series returned to Darlington Raceway after 9 years of absence from the track. The race was held on Sunday, September 6, 2020 in Darlington, South Carolina at Darlington Raceway, a  permanent egg-shaped racetrack. The race was extended from the scheduled 147 laps to 152 due to a NASCAR overtime attempt caused by a crash including Josh Reaume. At race's end, Ben Rhodes of ThorSport Racing would move up to the front due to strategy and hold off Derek Kraus to win, the 3rd win of his career in the NASCAR Gander RV & Outdoors Truck Series and the first and only win of the season. To fill out the podium, Derek Kraus of McAnally-Hilgemann Racing and Austin Hill of Hattori Racing Enterprises would finish 2nd and 3rd, respectively.

After a two-year absence from racing, Trevor Bayne would return for the race in the No. 40 for Niece Motorsports.

Background 

Darlington Raceway is a race track built for NASCAR racing located near Darlington, South Carolina. It is nicknamed "The Lady in Black" and "The Track Too Tough to Tame" by many NASCAR fans and drivers and advertised as "A NASCAR Tradition." It is of a unique, somewhat egg-shaped design, an oval with the ends of very different configurations, a condition which supposedly arose from the proximity of one end of the track to a minnow pond the owner refused to relocate. This situation makes it very challenging for the crews to set up their cars' handling in a way that is effective at both ends.

Entry list

Starting lineup 
The starting lineup wasselected based on the results and fastest lap of the last race, the 2020 CarShield 200 and owner's points. As a result, Brett Moffitt of GMS Racing would win the pole.

Race results 
Stage 1 Laps: 45

Stage 2 Laps: 45

Stage 3 Laps: 62

References 

2020 NASCAR Gander RV & Outdoors Truck Series
NASCAR races at Darlington Raceway
September 2020 sports events in the United States
2020 in sports in South Carolina